Sara Thacher is an American game and experience designer. She is one of the founders of the San Francisco-based immersive experience The Jejune Institute and works as a creative director and senior R&D Imagineer at Walt Disney Imagineering, including creative leadership on the Star Wars: Galactic Starcruiser two-day immersive Disney experience.

Education
Thacher studied glass at the Rhode Island School of Design and earned a Masters of Fine Arts in Social Practice at the California College of the Arts.

Career
Thacher was one of the creators of the multi-chapter interactive experience The Jejune Institute in San Francisco, with Jeff Hull and Uriah Findley. She served as a lead producer and experience designer for Nonchalance after answering a Craigslist recruiting ad. She is featured in the 2013 documentary about The Jejune Institute, The Institute.

She later worked for The Go Game and was a producer and designer on FutureCoast, a future forecasting game by World Without Oil's Ken Eklund that ran in February 2014. FutureCoast was funded by a grant from the National Science Foundation to Columbia University's Polar Partnership.

The game explored climate change, its effect on polar ice, and rising sea levels through a series of voicemails from the future. The game also used in-person experiences, geocached items, and social media to engage audiences.

Thacher works as a senior creative director and research and development Imagineer at Walt Disney Imagineering. Her work includes creative leadership on the Star Wars: Galactic Starcruiser two-day immersive Disney experience, the Themed Entertainment Association Award-winning Haunted Mansion: Ghost Post, and alternate reality game The Optimist, a game set around Anaheim, California and inside Disneyland that served as a promotional tie-in to the 2015 film Tomorrowland.

References

Living people
Transmediation
American video game designers
Women video game designers
Disney people
Rhode Island School of Design alumni
California College of the Arts alumni

Year of birth missing (living people)